Konstantin Mikhaylovich Sergeyev (5 March 1910 (20 February Old Style) – 1 April 1992) was a Russian danseur, artistic director and choreographer for the Kirov Theatre. When the Kirov Ballet returned to Leningrad from Perm (where it had been moved during the war) Sergeyev became the head choreographer of the company. His first major work was to restage Prokofiev's Cinderella, which is still performed in the present day.

His teachers at Leningrad State Choreographic Institute: Mariya Kojukhova, Vladimir Ponomaryov, Viktor Semyonov (Marina Semyonova's first husband).

His first wife Feya Balabina was a prima ballerina of the Kirov ballet, as was his second wife Natalia Dudinskaya. He danced with Dudinskaya at the 1946 premiere of his Cinderella production for the Kirov.

Galina Ulanova was his partner between 1930 and 1940. Sergeyev and Ulanova were the first to dance Romeo and Juliet in Sergei Prokofiev's ballet of the same name. Sergeyev was named a People's Artist of the USSR in 1957 and a Hero of Socialist Labour in 1991. He was the recipient of four Stalin Prizes.

See also
List of Russian ballet dancers

References

1910 births
1992 deaths
Russian male ballet dancers
Choreographers of Mariinsky Theatre
People's Artists of the USSR
Heroes of Socialist Labour
20th-century Russian ballet dancers